William Fell may refer to:

 William Scott Fell, Australian politician
 William Fell (writer), English writer
 William Richmond Fell, New Zealand naval officer

See also